"So Get Up", written and vocalized by Ithaka (also known as Ithaka Darin Pappas), is a 1992 spoken-word electronic dance music vocal-poem lyric song more frequently credited to the Portuguese house music production duo Underground Sound of Lisbon, German trance music duo Cosmic Gate, the Spanish group Committee and London-based DJ/producers, Stretch & Vern.

Ithaka Darin Pappas lived and recorded in Lisbon, Portugal, from 1992 to 1998. His poem "So Get Up" (then entitled "So Get Up, the End of the Earth Is Upon Us") was written and first vocalized on December 13 of 1992 for a program called Quarto Bairro on Rádio Comercial in Lisbon. The station's radio presenter, Pedro Costa, recorded Ithaka's voice live on-air. Two months later, in March 1993, a techno-pop demo was made in Manchester, England, with a student engineer-producer. The initial 'publicly released, physically manufactured' musical element backing the poem was created in 1994 by DJ Vibe and Doctor J aka Underground Sound of Lisbon (or USL) who invited Ithaka (at that time using an alias name, Korvowrong) to re-record the poem as a guest vocalist on their first release.

USL's nine-minute progressive house version of "So Get Up" appeared on the B-side of their "Chapter One" 12-inch vinyl release. In Portugal this was distributed by Kaos Records, and worldwide by Tribal UK and U.S. label Twisted Records. It soon became a major Portuguese dance music "national anthem" and influenced a large populace of Portuguese youth to get interested in house music, famous for Ithaka's shouting "The end of the earth is upon us. Pretty soon it'll all turn to dust, So Get Up!, forget the past, go outside and have a blast!"
In 1994, the UK edition of the single, had several remixes by Danny Tenaglia and Junior Vasquez as well as an original mix and two different a cappella variations. This first international edition sold approximately 80,000 copies, with over a million copies of the song sold between 1994-1995 via international compilations, reaching the #1 ranking on specialized dance music charts around the world.

Thru the last three decades, So Get Up under varying titles such as; "Get Up", "Insane", "Go Insane", "Get Up! Go Insane!", "Forget the Past", "Next Life", "See You In The Next Life" "The End Of The Earth", "The End Of The Earth Is Upon Us", "Hardventure", "Headcharge", "Hurt", "Belther", "Last Resurrection", "Earthquake", "PPF (Past Present Future)", "Intensity", "My Tripcreator", "Viginti Etduo", "Trance Line", "Zombie", "All Points North", "Speed O.J.", "1000 Miles" etc. has been remixed, sampled and released in a multitude of EDM styles on the records of; Fatboy Slim, Stretch & Vern, Oxia, Peter Bailey, Orion's Voice, JJ Mullor, Dani Sbert, Lexington Avenue, Dylan, Derek Marin, Public Domain, K-Traxx, Technoboy, Bob Ray & Van Dyuk, Ben Gold, Pelari, Meat Katie and many others.

In 1995, a remix of "So Get Up", retitled "Trance Line" by the Madrid production team Committee (Dimas Carbajo and J.J. De La Fuente) rose to #3 in January 1995 on the Billboard Singles Chart for Spain, remaining in the Top Ten for more than a month. Committee's Trance Line versions, which also had several mixes of their own utilized all of Ithaka's original vocal, but none of Underground Sound Of Lisbon's instrumental.

In 2003, Miss Kittin used the entire "So Get Up" poem as part of the intro on her album Radio Caroline Vol.1.

Six remixes were initially made of "So Get Up" in 2014, but because two a capellas were included in the first U.S. and U.K. releases on Tribal Records, rogue musical versions using the vocal have snowballed out of control. Hundreds of House, Hardstyle, Progressive House, Speedcore, Trance, Techno, Tech House, Industrial, Rock, Dubstep and Gabber producers have simply placed the So Get Up vocal on their own instrumentals and called them their own (sometimes with subtle title changes, but often just as "So Get Up"). To date, there are now several hundred released remixes using Ithaka Darin Pappas' original vocal recording. As of late 2016, So Get Up now holds the distinction of being the most remixed vocal a cappella in musical history (Guinness World Record Holder 2016).

"So Get Up" by its individual producers and DJs has been played or performed at large-scale dance parties around the global such as the Electric Daisy Carnival in New York and Orlando (2016) as interpreted by Cosmic Gate. In early 2017, Armin Van Buuren opened a vinyl set at his own A State of Trance festival in Utrecht, Netherlands by playing the "So Get Up" a capella from 1994.

Lyrics

The end of the earth is upon us. Pretty soon it'll all turn to dust.
So get up. Forget the past. Go outside and have a blast.

Go a thousand miles in a jet airplane. Go out of your mind go insane.

To a place you never been before. Eat ice cream or you'll lick the floor.

'Cause, the end of the earth is upon us. Pretty soon it'll all turn to dust.

Goodbye my friends. Goodbye world. I'll see you in the next life.

Sorted film appearance (2000)
In the year 2000, a trance remix of Ithaka's "So Get Up" (entitled "See You In The Next Life") by Italian DJs, Atlantis, appeared during the closing titles sequence of the British feature film Sorted, directed by Alexander Jovy and starring Matthew Rhys, Sienna Guillory, Ben Moor and Tim Curry.

The soundtrack also includes songs by; Leftfield, Morcheeba, Public Enemy, Elvis Presley, Matt Darey, Southsugar, The Turtles, Mauro Picotto, Paul Johnson, Aphrodite, Agnelli & Nelson, Funky G, Gibson Brothers, St. Etienne, Kadda Cherif Hadria, Disposable Disco Dubs, Six Degrees, Da Hool, Highgate, Art Of Trance, Scott 4, Depeche Mode, Twisted Pair, Lost Tribe, and CRW.

"So Get Up" controversies
In December 1992, Ithaka had originally written and recited the poem called "So Get Up" (The End Of The Earth Is Upon Us) for his weekly segment of a program called Quarto Bairro on Rádio Comercial in Lisbon, Portugal. The next year he rerecorded it as a guest performer to be the primary vocal of a B-side single for the Portuguese dance music group called Underground Sound Of Lisbon. The song became an instant national hit and was soon released internationally as a ten-mix, double-vinyl set on New York's Tribal Records (a subsidiary of I.R.S. Records/E.M.I. Records). The song climbed to 1st place on the Billboard's Independent Dance Music Charts for the U.K.—and number 52nd in the United States.

Since 1995, the song has been remixed over a thousand times including versions by such performers as Fat Boy Slim, Junior Vasquez, Danny Tenaglia, and Cosmic Gate, and has appeared on over one hundred compilations with combined sales in the millions. As the original music has been stripped away by each succeeding producer, the only singularly unifying element of all 1,000+ mixes of "So Get Up" is Ithaka's poem and his vocals. The song, which was considered the first modern "Portuguese" musical export, was released without a featuring Ithaka credit, even though Ithaka (a Californian who was only temporarily residing in Lisbon) is the primary publishing rights owner of the track and never a member of the Underground Sound Of Lisbon project. Reportedly no record royalties were ever paid to Ithaka Darin Pappas.

In 1999, Samsung in Korea featured a version of "So Get Up" (remixed by U.K. Breakbeat duo, Stretch N Vern) for a national My Jet printer ad series featuring actress Jun Ji-Hyun. According to almost all online biographical sources, the commercial transformed Ji-Hyun into a teen idol in Korea and today Jun Ji-Hyun is one of the most prominent celebrities in the entire country. The commercial, which was made by Cheil Communications, did not get authorization from either Ithaka or Stretch N Vern for the usage.

In 2013, German Trance superstars Cosmic Gate also excluded Ithaka's vocal-lyrical credit even though they licensed the entire "So Get Up" a capella. Without a doubt, Cosmic Gate's version of has become the biggest commercial success of So Get Up to date. In October 2013, it charted at number 1 on Beatport's trance music charts after being featured on Armin Van Buuren's compilation A State of Trance 2013, on Hardwell On Air Episode 133 and on Cosmic Gate's album Start to Feel (2014), with additional mixes by Pelari, Alex di Stefano and Ben Gold. It has been a festival favorite for the group since its release, being performed at Amsterdam Dance Event, Electric Daisy Carnival, Ultra Music Festival and on Cosmic Gate's own world tour.

Versions, remixes, uses and sampling
Documented uses of vocal and poem, So Get Up [by Ithaka Darin Pappas ©1993] in modern music appearing under varying titles. Poem was originally recorded for Radio Cómercial in Lisbon, Portugal in 1992. However, most musical versions have stemmed from illegal uses or sampling of the a cappella version that was recorded for Underground Sound Of Lisbon in Portugal, 1994. Note: This incomplete list includes both legal and unauthorized uses.

1992
Ithaka – Rádio Commercial Lisbon "So Get Up" (lyrics and vocals by: Ithaka) Acapella recorded Dec 13th 1992 with engineer Pedro Costa.

1993
Ithaka – "So Get Up 1993" (lyrics and vocals by: Ithaka) Electro 'demo' version recorded in Manchester, England – February 1993
Underground Sound Of Lisbon – "So Get Up" – Original Mix – (lyrics and vocals by: Ithaka) Kaos Records

1994
Ithaka – "So Get Up" – Acapella – (lyrics and vocals by: Ithaka) – Engineer: Sinewave – TRIBAL America/I.R.S.
Junior Vasquez – "So Get Up – Junior's Factory Mix (lyrics and vocals by: Ithaka) TRIBAL America/I.R.S.
Junior Vasquez – "So Get Up" – Factory Dub (lyrics and vocals by: Ithaka) TRIBAL America/I.R.S.
Danny Tenaglia – "So Get Up – Danny's "In The Light We Sleep" Mix (lyrics and vocals by: Ithaka) TRIBAL America/I.R.S.
Danny Tenaglia – "So Get Up – Get-Upella Mix (lyrics and vocals by: Ithaka) TRIBAL America/I.R.S.
Danny Tenaglia – "So Get Up – It's 4 P.M. Danny, Get Up! Dub (lyrics and vocals by: Ithaka)TRIBAL America/I.R.S.
Orion's Voice – "The Next Life": Original Mix (lyrics and vocals by: Ithaka)
Sarasite – "The End Of The Earth"- Jatzzup Mix (lyrics and vocals by: Ithaka) Melody Maker Records, Italy
Sarasite – "The End Of The Earth" – Patrick P.D.jJ. Tribal Mix (lyrics and vocals by: Ithaka) Melody Maker Records, Italy
Sarasite – "The End Of The Earth": M.C. Hair New Wave Vibrations mix (lyrics and vocals by: Ithaka)Melody Maker Records, Italy

1995
Committee – "Trance Line" (lyrics and vocals by: Ithaka) Lost Paradise Records
Public Domain – "So Get Up" : Jeremy mix (lyrics and vocals by: Ithaka) BZRK Records, Netherlands
Public Domain – "So Get Up" : Dr. Phil's mix (lyrics and vocals by: Ithaka) BZRK Records, Netherlands
Public Domain – "So Get Up" : original mix (lyrics and vocals by: Ithaka) BZRK Records, Netherlands

1996
K.S. – "Fellini's Circus" - Active Bass Music [Italy]
Tecmania Rebel (aka Patrick van der Hart) – "So Get Up" – (lyrics and vocals by: Ithaka) The Violet E.P. – Planet Dance Records [Netherlands]

1997
Next Generation - The Earthquake - (lyrics and vocals by: Ithaka) Ipnotika Records (Italy)
Joystick (aka Jason "Jinx" Zambito) – "Go Insane" – (lyrics and vocals by: Ithaka) Yoshitoshi Recordings/Deep Dish Records [USA]
Stretch & Vern – "Get Up, Go Insane !" – The Terrace Edit – (lyrics and vocals by: Ithaka) Spot On Records [UK]
Stretch & Vern – "Get Up, Go Insane !" – Fatboy Really Lost It – (lyrics and vocals by: Ithaka) Spot On Records [UK]
Stretch & Vern – "Get Up, Go Insane !" – Disco Dub by Fatboy Slim – (lyrics and vocals by: Ithaka) Avex Trax [China]
Stretch & Vern – "Get Up, Go Insane !" – Moonmens Theme – (lyrics and vocals by: Ithaka) Spot On Records [UK]
Stretch & Vern – "Get Up, Go Insane !" – Rock 'N' Roll Mix – (lyrics and vocals by: Ithaka) Spot On Records [UK]
Stretch & Vern – "Get Up, Go Insane !" – Disco Dub Katz Mix by Fatboy Slim – (lyrics and vocals by: Ithaka) FFRR Records [UK]
Stretch & Vern – "Get Up, Go Insane !" – Bonus Acid Beat by FatBoy Slim – (lyrics and vocals by: Ithaka) Grandslam Records / Strictly Rhythm [USA]

1998
Joystick (aka Jason "Jinx" Zambito) – "Go Insane" – Go Insane Remix (lyrics and vocals by: Ithaka) Yoshitoshi Recordings/Deep Dish Records [USA]
Joystick (aka Jason "Jinx" Zambito) – "Go Insane" – Psychic Girls' Groove (lyrics and vocals by: Ithaka) Yoshitoshi Recordings/Deep Dish Records [USA]
Pathfinder – "So Get Up '98" – Odysee Of Life Remix(lyrics and vocals by: Ithaka) Refreshed [Germany]
Pathfinder – "So Get Up '98" – Apocalyptic Remix (lyrics and vocals by: Ithaka) Refreshed [Germany]

1999
Marcel – Viginti Etduo – (lyrics and vocals by: Ithaka) Mole Listening Pearls [Germany]
Samsung My Jet Mix – Get Up! Go Insane! (lyrics and vocals by: Ithaka) Commercial starring Jun Ji-Hyun

2000
Fatboy Slim aka Norman Cook – Fatboy Slim's Greatest Remixes – "Get Up, Go Insane!" (lyrics and vocals by: Ithaka) (lyrics, vocals) Priarity Records
Atlantis ITA – See You In The Next Life : original mix (lyrics and vocals by: Ithaka) Overodose Records, Germany
Atlantis ITA – See You In The Next Life : DJ Scot Project remix (lyrics and vocals by: Ithaka) Overodose Records [Germany]

2001
Ce Ce Lee – "Get Up" – (lyrics and vocals by: Ithaka) 24 Records Italy
PCP – "Zombie" – (lyrics and vocals by: Ithaka) PTP Records [Germany], Bit Music [Spain], Hardcore Maniacs [Spain]

2002
Miss Kittin – "So Get Up" Intro Acapella – (lyrics and vocals by: Ithaka) Groove Records [Switzerland]
K-Traxx – "Hardventure" – Original Mix – (lyrics and vocals by: Ithaka) Titanic Records, [Italy]
High Voltage – "Go Insane" – (lyrics and vocals by: Ithaka) Sys-X Records [Netherlands]
Dylan – "Headcharge" – (lyrics and vocals by: Ithaka <> produced by Dylan Hilsley) Earth EP – Renegade Hardware Records [UK]

2003
Orion's Voice – "The Next Life": original mix (lyrics and vocals by: Ithaka) Re-Fuel Records, Netherlands
Orion's Voice – "The Next Life": Origin Unknown remix (lyrics and vocals by: Ithaka) Re-Fuel Records, Netherlands

2004
Yoshi & Chia - "Turn To Dust" (lyrics & vocals by: Ithaka Darin Pappas) X-Ite Records (UK)
Mert Yücel – "So Get Up" – DeepXperience Mix – (lyrics and vocals by: Ithaka) Kaos Records [Portugal]
Eric Kupper – "So Get Up" – Tribalectro Mix – (lyrics and vocals by: Ithaka) Kaos Records [Portugal]
King-Size – "So Get Up" – King-Size Mix – (lyrics and vocals by: Ithaka) Kaos Records [Portugal]
Dan Robbins – "So Get Up" – Three Dimension Mix – (lyrics and vocals by: Ithaka) Kaos Records [Portugal]
Low End Specialists – "So Get Up" – Low End Specialists Mix – (lyrics and vocals by: Ithaka) Kaos Records [Portugal]
Committee – "Trance Line" – TCR Mix – (lyrics and vocals by: Ithaka) Trance Corporation Recordings [Spain]

2005
Architect – "Speed O.J." – (lyrics and vocals by: Ithaka) Hymen Records [Germany]
Meat Katie featuring Ithaka– "Phat Prick" – (lyrics and vocals by: Ithaka) Fabric Records [UK]

2006
Phobia – "All Points North" – (lyrics and vocals by: Ithaka) All Points North EP – Renegade Hardware Records [UK]
Magik Johnson - "In The Next Life" (lyrics and vocals by: Ithaka) NRK Music [UK]

2007
DJ Evol - "Next Life (lyrics & vocals by: ithaka) Combat Records [USA]
Lexicon Avenue– "So Get Up" – Damaged People Remix – (lyrics and vocals by: Ithaka) Forensic Records [UK]
Dave Seaman – "So Get Up" – Mirabeau Remix – (lyrics and vocals by: Ithaka) Forensic Records [UK]
Ray & Suly - "Oclusion" – (lyrics and vocals by: Ithaka) Echo90 Records (Spain)

2008
Mowree – "So Get Up" – Next Life Mix – (lyrics and vocals by: Ithaka) Absolutely Records [Italy]
Sharp & Smooth (Alex Bass and David Mimram) – "So Get Up" – Sharp & Smooth Remix – (lyrics and vocals by: Ithaka) Absolutely Records [Italy]
Phunk Investigation – "So Get Up" – O' Tech Mix – (lyrics and vocals by: Ithaka) Absolutely Records [Italy]
Phunk Investigation – "So Get Up" – Turbolento Mix – (lyrics and vocals by: Ithaka) Absolutely Records [Italy]
Phunk Investigation – "So Get Up" – Shuffling Phunk Investigation Mix – (lyrics and vocals by: Ithaka) Absolutely Records [Italy]
DJ Zorneus – "Insane" – DJ Zorneus Mix – (lyrics and vocals by: Ithaka) Mental Madness Records [Germany]
Lochness DJ Team – "Insane" – Lochness DJ Team Remix – (lyrics and vocals by: Ithaka) Mental Madness Records [Germany]
Maziano – "Insane" – Maziano Remix – (lyrics and vocals by: Ithaka) Mental Madness Records [Germany]
Dantime – "Insane" – Dantime Remix – (lyrics and vocals by: Ithaka) Mental Madness Records [Germany]
Seikos – "Insane" – Seikos ICE507 Old Vinyl Remix – (lyrics and vocals by: Ithaka) Mental Madness Records [Germany]

2009
Dan Edge - "Get Up" (lyrics and vocals by: Ithaka) Album: Ravers Addition 3 [UK]
X-Cyte - "The Next Life" (lyrics and vocals by: Ithaka) Album: Ravers Addition 3 [UK]
2 DJs In A Room – "The End Of The Earth" – (lyrics and vocals by: Ithaka) Album: Hardstyle Connection / Mega Prod Records [France]
Steve Hill & Technikal – "Forget The Past" – (lyrics and vocals by: Ithaka) Album: World Series Amsterdam / Masif Records [Australia]
Andrea Doria & Dino Lenny – "So Get Up" Cover Version – Andre Doria Mix – (lyrics by: Ithaka) Afterglow Records
Andrea Doria & Dino Lenny – "So Get Up" Cover Version – Dino Lenny Mix – (lyrics by: Ithaka) Afterglow Records
Andrea Doria & Dino Lenny – "So Get Up" Cover Version – Original Rework – (lyrics by: Ithaka) Afterglow Records

2010
Morbus M. "Forget The Past" (lyrics & vocals by: Ithaka) Album: Forget The Past [Hands]
Philippe Rochard – "PPF (Past Present Future)" – (lyrics and vocals by: Ithaka) Album: Angels and Demons / Sector Beatz [Switzerland]
Peace Maker – "Turn To Dust" – (lyrics & vocals by: Ithaka) Album: Intensity / Nutek Records [Spain]
Peace Maker "Turn To Dust" – Field Mix – (lyrics & vocals by: Ithaka) Album: California Dreaming / United Beats Records [Spain]

2011
Bart Skils – "Dust" – (lyrics & vocals by: Ithaka) Tronic [Sweden]
Mike Steventon & Tone – "Get Up" (lyrics & vocals by: Ithaka) 011, K405 Records [UK]
Plusculaar – "Have A Blast" – (lyrics & vocals by: Ithaka) Album: Rare Species / Electronic Zoo Music
Outworld -"Alien Life Forms, Goodbye My Friends" – (lyrics & vocals by: Ithaka) Album: Outworld /Blue Byte [Belgium]
DJ Pibert – "Jet Airplane" – DJ Activator Remix – (lyrics & vocals by: Ithaka) Album: DJ style 2) / Hardnetmusic-Edinet Publishing [Italy]
Horizon "Turn To Dust" – (lyrics & vocals by: Ithaka) Album: Ancient Future) Phantasm Records [UK]

2012
Black Force – "Next Life" – (lyrics and vocals by: Ithaka) Part Three EP / Activa Records [Italy]
Bageera – "Go Insane!" – (lyrics & vocals by: Ithaka) Atypical Records [Spain]
JJ Mullor, Dani Sebert – "So Get Up" – (lyrics & vocals by: Ithaka) Supermarket Records [Spain]
Marco Calanni – "Forget The Past" – (lyrics and vocals by: Ithaka) – Konstrukt Records [Turkey]
Peace Maker – "Turn To Dust" – (lyrics and vocals by: Ithaka) Album: Best Of 2011 / United Beats Records [Spain]
Hakan Sarugil – "So Get Up" – Original Mix – (lyrics and vocals by: Ithaka) Album: High Tech Soul #3 / Bliss Point Records
Cassien Jean – "Goodbye My Friends" – (lyrics and vocals by: Ithaka) Album: Various Artists / Spur Records [Italy]
Jay Dahbi – "Go Insane" – Extended Mix – (lyrics & vocals: Ithaka) Album: The Weekend / Soltrenz Records [USA]
Danny Garlick – "So Get Up" – (lyrics & vocals by: Ithaka) White Mind Records [UK], Bedroom Music [USA]
Danny Garlick – "So Get Up" – Original Mix – (lyrics and vocals by: Ithaka) Digital+ Records [Spain]
Derek Marin – "The End Of The Earth" (lyrics & vocals: Ithaka) Albums: Culture Response / Streetlight Records, Plastic City [Germany]
Derek Marin – "The End Of The Earth" – full vocal mix – (lyrics and vocals by: Ithaka) Album: Satellite Subspace / Streetlight Records [Germany]
Derek Marin – "The End Of The Earth" – Dub – (lyrics and vocals by: Ithaka) Plastic City Records [Germany]

2013
Armin Van Buuren – "So Get Up" – (lyrics & vocals by: Ithaka) Album: A State Of Trance 2013 – Armada Records [Netherlands]
Hardwell – "So Get Up" – Hardwell On Air Episode 133 Mix – (lyrics & vocals by: Ithaka)
Cosmic Gate – "So Get Up" – (lyrics & vocals by: Ithaka) – Wake Your Mind Records [Germany]
Cosmic Gate – "So Get Up" – Extended Mix – (lyrics & vocals by: Ithaka) Wake Your Mind Records [Netherlands]
Cosmic Gate "So Get Up" – HeatBeat Remix – (lyrics & vocals by: Ithaka) Wake Your Mind Records [Netherlands]
Cosmic Gate "So Get Up" – Pelari Remix – (lyrics & vocals by: Ithaka) Wake Your Mind Records [Netherlands]
Cosmic Gate "So Get Up" – Ben Gold Remix – (lyrics & vocals by: Ithaka) Wake Your Mind Records [Netherlands]
Cosmic Gate "So Get Up" – Radio Edit – (lyrics & vocals by: Ithaka) Album: Vonyc Sessions / Vandit Records [Germany]
HeatBeat (Agustin Servente & Matias Chavez) – "So Get Up" – HeatBeat Remix – (lyrics & vocals by: ithaka) – Wake Your Mind Records [Germany]
Carlos HP – "Get Up" – (lyrics & vocals by: Ithaka) YPQN Records [Spain]
Rich Gior "Goodbye World" – (lyrics & vocals by: Ithaka) Album: Miami Vibes Productions / Dark Vibe Productions [USA]
Audio Noir "Lick The Floor" – Original Mix – (lyrics & vocals by: Ithaka) Bonzai Progressive [Belgium]
Damien Blaze – "Out Of Your Mind" – (lyrics & vocals by: Ithaka) Electrified Recordings
Koozah – "Next Life" – (lyrics & vocals by: Ithaka) Next Cyclone Records [Italy]
Koozah – "Next Life" – (lyrics & vocals by: Ithaka) Next Cyclone/Sonic Solution [Italy]
Koozah "Next Life" – Edit – (lyrics & vocals by: Ithaka) Next Cyclone/Sonic Solution [Netherlands]
Morgana DJ – "The Next Life" – (lyrics & vocals by: Ithaka) Emmestudio Records [Italy]
Marcel "Viginti Etduo"- (lyrics and vocals by: Ithaka) Album: Viginti Etduo / Mole Listening Pearls [Germany]
Bob Ray, Van Dyuk "So Get Up" – (lyrics and vocals by: Ithaka) Elektrobeats Records [Italy]
Furio Levant – "So Get Up" – (lyrics & vocals by: Ithaka) Doctors of Chaos Records [Italy]
Furio Levant – "So Get Up!" – Original Mix – (lyrics & vocals by: Ithaka) – Doctors Of Chaos Records [Italy]
Slow Panpot – "The End Of The Earth" – (lyrics & vocals by: Ithaka) Album: Basewate / Sibilant Records
Koozah – "Next Life" – (lyrics & vocals by: Ithaka) Next Cyclone/Sonic Solution [Italy]
Koozah "Next Life" – Edit – (lyrics & vocals by: Ithaka) Next Cyclone/Sonic Solution [Netherlands]

2014
Ben Gold – "So Get Up" – Ben Gold Remix – (lyrics and vocals by: Ithaka) Armada Records [Netherlands]
Pelari – "So Get Up" – Pelari Radio Edit – (lyrics and vocals by: Ithaka) Armada Records [Netherlands]
Igor Carmo – "So Get Up" – (lyrics and vocals by: Ithaka) Nervous Records [USA]
JJ Mullor, Dani Sbert – "So Get Up" – (lyrics and vocals by: Ithaka) Supermarket Records
Atmozfears – "The Next Life" – (lyrics and vocals by: Ithaka) – Memory Stick Records [Netherlands]
Loose Effects – "Get Up" – (lyrics and vocals by: Ithaka) Under Noize Records [El Salvador]
Swing Kings – "The End Of The Earth" – Original Mix – (lyrics and vocals by: Ithaka) Orange Groove Records [UK]
Ninja, Cab Thomas – "The Next Life" – (lyrics and vocals by: Ithaka) Thundercut Records [Germany]
Peace Maker – "Turn To Dust" – Field Mix – (lyrics and vocals by: Ithaka) United Beats Records – [Spain]
Audio Noir – "Floorlicker" – (lyrics and vocals by: Ithaka) Albums: Club Traxx 2014, WMC Miami 2014 / Bonzai Progressive [Belgium]
Let's Try – "Goodbye World" – (lyrics and vocals by: Ithaka) Keep It Pure Music [Turkey]
Mr. Argenis – "The End Of The Earth" – (lyrics and vocals by: Ithaka) LCA Records [France]
Trolley Snatcha – "The End Of The Earth" (lyrics and vocals by: Ithaka) Album: Archetype / Firepower Records [Canada]
Gu'Brian – "Go Insane" – (lyrics and vocals by: Ithaka) Complex Drop Records [Peru]
Maik Ibane – "So Get Up" – (lyrics and vocals by: Ithaka) Vendetta Records [Spain]
Maik Ibane – "So Get Up" – Extended Mix – (lyrics and vocals by: Ithaka) Vendetta Records – [Spain]
Micromakine – "Last Resurrection" – (lyrics and vocals by: Ithaka) Union Recordings [Poland]
Micromakine – "Last Resurrection" – Original Mix – (lyrics and vocals by: Ithaka) Union Recordings [Poland]
Micromakine – "Last Resurrection" – Cooh Remix – (lyrics and vocals by: Ithaka) Union Recordings [Poland]
Acti, Antolini – "Belther" – Original Mix – (lyrics and vocals by: Ithaka) Albums: Defqon.1 2014, Q-Base / Q-Dance [Netherlands]
Acti, Antolini – "Belther" – Orbital Edit – (lyrics and vocals by: Ithaka) Subground Records [Italy]
Acti, Antolini – "Belther" – Extended Mix – (lyrics and vocals by: Ithaka) Subground Records [Italy]
TNT (aka Technoboy), Tuneboy & Zatox – "Intensity" – (lyrics & vocals by: Ithaka) Album: Certified One / HARDwithSTYLE Records [Netherlands]
TNT, Zatox – "Intensity" – Original Mix – (lyrics and vocals by: Ithaka) Q-Dance Records [Netherlands]
TNT, Zatox – "Intensity" – Edit – (lyrics and vocals by: Ithaka) HardwithStyle Records [Netherlands]
TNT, Zatox – "Intensity" – Radio Cut – (lyrics and vocals by: Ithaka) Titanic Records [Italy]
TNT, Zatox – "Intensity" – Extended Version – (lyrics and vocals by: Ithaka) Titanic Records [Italy]
DJ Kryst-Off – "Go Insane featuring Breaker" – Reloaded Mix – (lyrics and vocals by: Ithaka) Mental Madness Records [Germany]
DJ Kryst-Off, Breaker – "Go Insane" – Bresker Old School Mix (lyrics and vocals by: Ithaka) Album: DJ Case / Mental Madness Records [Germany]
DJ Kryst-Off, Breaker – "Go Insane" – Old School Mix – (lyrics and vocals by: Ithaka) Albums: DJ Case, Go Insane / Mental Madness – [Germany]
DJ Kryst-Off, Breaker – "Go Insane" – Old School Edit – (lyrics and vocals by: Ithaka) Album: Go Insane / Mental Madness – [Germany]
DJ Kryst-Off, Breaker – "Go Insane" – Handzup Mix – (lyrics and vocals by: Ithaka) Album: DJ Case / Mental Madness Records [Germany]
DJ Kryst-Off, Breaker – "Go Insane" – HandzUp Edit – (lyrics and vocals by: Ithaka) Album: Go Insane / Mental Madness [Germany]
DJ Kryst-Off, Breaker – "Go Insane" – Live Mix – (lyrics and vocals by: Ithaka) Album: EDM Madness / Mental Madness [Germany]
DJ Kryst-Off, Breaker – "Go Insane" – Reloaded Mix – (lyrics and vocals by: Ithaka) Album: EDM Madness / Mental Madness [Germany]
DJ Kryst-Off, Breaker – "Go Insane" – Reloaded Edit – (lyrics and vocals by: Ithaka) Album: Go Insane / Mental Madness [Germany]

2015
DJ Lugo - "Get Up" - (lyrics and vocals by: Ithaka) Cirka Music [Venezuela]
Razat – "Get Up" – Mash-Up Masterblast Mix – (lyrics and vocals by: Ithaka) Moscow Mule Records [Russia]
Razat – "Get Up" – Hash-In-The Bowl Dubstep Mix – (lyrics and vocals by: Ithaka) Moscow Mule Records [Russia]
Alex Page – "So Get Up, Atom Bride" (lyrics and vocals by: Ithaka)
Lee Burridge – "So Get Up" – Burning Man Essential Mix – (lyrics and vocals by: Ithaka) BBC One Radio [UK]
FuturePlays (Mexico) – "So Get Uo" – Original Mix – (lyrics and vocals by: Ithaka) Boshporus Underground Recordings [Turkey]
Samir Kuliev – "So Get Up" – Samir Kuilev Re-Edit – (lyrics and vocals by: Ithaka) Chuvstvo Ritma Records [Russia]
Pagano – "So Get Up" – Pagano 2015 Mix (lyrics and vocals by: Ithaka) Tribal Records [USA]
Pagano – "So Get Up" – Pagano 2015 Dub (lyrics and vocals by: Ithaka) Tribal Records [USA]
Cosmic Gate – "So Get Up"- (lyrics & vocals by: Ithaka) Start To Feel, Deluxe album version / Armada Music Bundles [Netherlands]
Paradigm X – "The End Of The Earth" – (lyrics and vocals by: Ithaka) Album UK Trendz #3 / U.K. Trendz [UK]
Fuelo Ruedo – "It's Upon Us" – (lyrics and vocals by: Ithaka) Cats Love Bass Records [Italy]
Fuelo Ruedo – "I'll See You" – (lyrics and vocals by: Ithaka) Cats Love Bass Records [Italy]
Cubik, Checo Zak – "Forget The Past" (Original Mix) 2015, Dilematic Records Czech Republic
Cubik, Checo Zak – "Forget The Past" Javas Remix Dilematic Records [Czech Republic]
Cubik, Checo Zak – "Forget The Past" – JM Blex Remix – (lyrics and vocals by: Ithaka) Dilematic Records [Czech Republic]
Maik Ibane – "So Get Up" – Radio Edit Blanco Y Negro Musica [Spain]
Doppeldosen – "The End Of The Earth" – (lyrics and vocals by: Ithaka) Raizo Music [Spain]
Joseph LP – "So Get Up"- (lyrics and vocals by: Ithaka) People Tech Records [Venezuela]
Marcel – "Viginti Etduo" – (lyrics and vocals by: Ithaka) Album: Christam Escapades/Parasol Phonoteque [Germany]
Marcel – "Viginti Etduo" – (lyrics and vocals by: Ithaka) Album: Amsterdam Bar Longue / Parasol Phonoteque [Germany]
Acti, Antolini – "Belther" – Orbital Edit – (lyrics and vocals by: Ithaka) Drizzly Music [Germany]
Derek Marin – "The End Of The Earth" – (lyrics and vocals by: Ithaka) Album: Plastic City Revised / Plastic City [Germany]
Dejay D, Ozy & Ash – "The End Of The Earth" – (lyrics and vocals by: Ithaka) Album: Cheeky Bounce Stompers / Cheeky Tracks Records [U.K.]
Manu Kenton – "Get Up" – (lyrics and vocals by: Ithaka) Kentek Recordings [France]

2016
Ring - "Good Bye World" – (lyrics/vocals by: Ithaka) Bullfinch Records
Fabio Monesi - "Acid Storm" – (lyrics/vocals by: Ithaka) Russian Torrents Verions/L.I.E.S. Records
Club Atlas (Branko/Buraka Som Sistema) – "So Get Up" – Red Bull Culture Clash Mix – (lyrics/vocals by: Ithaka) Live Coliseu dos Recreios [Portugal]
Alex Di Stefano – "So Get Up" – Mix Cut Remix – (lyrics and vocals by: Ithaka) Black Hole Recordings
Geometric Dark – "So Get Up" – Original Mix – (lyrics and vocals by: Ithaka) Party Label Unique Records [Netherlands]
FuturePlays (Mexico) – "So Get Up" – Vocal Mix – (lyrics and vocals by: Ithaka) Black Habitat Records
DJ Dũng Tí – "So Get Up" – DJ Dũng Tí – (lyrics and vocals by: Ithaka)
Cosmic Gate – "So Get Up" – Alex Di Stefano Extended Remix – (lyrics and vocals by: Ithaka) Wake Your Mind/Armada [Netherlands]
Cosmic Gate – "So Get Up" – Alex Di Stefano Extended Remix – (lyrics and vocals by: Ithaka) Black Hole Recordings – Netherlands
Meat Katie – "Next Life" – (lyrics and vocals by: Ithaka) album: Back In The Day – Lowering The Tone Records [U.K.]
Marc Hartman – "A Place You've Never Been Before" – (lyrics and vocals by: Ithaka) album: Changes – Lemon Grass Music [Germany]
TNT, Zatox – "Intensity" – Extended Version – (lyrics and vocals by: Ithaka) Starlight Records [Italy]
Pepo, Pacho – "Next Life" – (lyrics and vocals by: Ithaka) Be One Limited Records [Spain]
Geometric Dark – "So Get Up" – (lyrics and vocals by: Ithaka)Party Label Unique Records [Netherlands]
Nell Silva – "So Get Up" – 22 Years Of So Get Up – (lyrics and vocals by: Ithaka) Desire Records [Portugal]
Nell Silva – "So Get Up" – Vortex Version – (lyrics and vocals by: Ithaka) Desire Records [Portugal]
Nell Silva – "So Get Up" – Original Version remastered – (lyrics and vocals by: Ithaka) Desire Records [Portugal]
Nell Silva – "So Get Up" – Vortex Version remastered 2016, Desire Records [Portugal]
Acti, Antolini – "Belther" – Orbital Edit – (lyrics and vocals by: Ithaka)Berlin Sensation [Germany]
DANTEE, Alternative Journey – "The End Of The Earth" – (lyrics and vocals by: Ithaka) album: Brazil Generation #3
Swing Kings – "The End Of The Earth" – (lyrics and vocals by: Ithaka) album: The Disco LP 2 – Orange Groove Records [UK]
ZRG – "Forget The Past" – Chris Drifter Remix (lyrics and vocals by: Ithaka) album: Club Runner – GR8 AL Music [Belgium]
ZRG – "Forget The Past" – Chris Drifter Remix (lyrics and vocals by: Ithaka) album: House Running – GR8 AL Music [Belgium]
Dr. Funk – "Get Up" – (lyrics and vocals by: Ithaka) album: Phunked Up – Foolish Records [Netherlands]
Dani Villa, Rodri Vegas – "Get Up" – (lyrics and vocals by: Ithaka) Dropper Get Up E.P. – Patent Skills Records Bulgaria

2017
Ithaka – "So Get Up 2017" (lyrics and vocals by: Ithaka) – Album: So Get Up & The Lost Acapellas (Sweatlodge Records)
Armin Van Buuren – "So Get Up" – Armin's Acapella Mix (lyrics and vocals by: Ithaka) Performed Live Feb. 18th – ASOT Festival [Utrecht, Netherlands]
Rui Flip – "All Turn To Dust" – (music and vocals: Rui Flip <> lyrics: Ithaka) Dogmain Records [Portugal]
2017 Violet, BLEID, Caroline Lethô, EDND, Yen Sung (feat. Belita, Maria Amor, Sonja) – "So Get Up – IWD Cover Version" – (lyrics by: Ithaka) Equality Now Records [UK]
Township Rebellion – "Next Life" – (lyrics and vocals by: Ithaka Darin Pappas) Stil Vor Talent [Germany]
Frankyeffe vs. Ithaka – "So Get Up" – (lyrics and vocals by: Ithaka Darin Pappas) Phobiq Records (Italy)
Hu Bee featuring Ithaka – "New World" – (lyrics and vocals by: Ithaka Darin Pappas) TED Records [France]
Jay Dahbi – "Go Insane" – Original Mix – (lyrics and vocals by: Ithaka) album: The Weekend – Soltrenz Records [NY, USA]
Jay Dahbi – "Go Insane" – Extended Mix – (lyrics and vocals by: Ithaka) album: The Weekend – Soltrenz Records [NY, USA]
Chaka & Marty – "Goodbye World" – (lyrics and vocals by: Ithaka) (album: Visions Of Tech House) RH2 [Germany]
MotivBreaks – "Forget The Past" – Original Mix – (lyrics and vocals by: Ithaka) Fantomas Records [Greece]
MotivBreaks – "Forget The Past" – Perfect Kombo Mix – (lyrics and vocals by: Ithaka) Fantomas Records [Greece]
Liquid Viking – "The End Of The Earth" – (lyrics and vocals by: Ithaka Darin Pappas) Uxmal Records, Mexico
Omar Lopez – "Have A Blast" – (lyrics and vocals by: Ithaka Darin Pappas) Darkside Digital Records [Argentina]
Neanderthal Phonogram – "Forget The Past" – Dj Kryst-Off & Betrand Mix -(lyrics and vocals by: Ithaka) Records [Germany]
Neanderthal Phonogram – "Forget The Past" – Dj Kryst-Off & Betrand Edit – (lyrics and vocals by: Ithaka) Aqualoop [Germany]
Neanderthal Phonogram – "Forget The Past" – Pulsedriver Remix – (lyrics and vocals by: Ithaka) Aqualoop [Germany]
Matheu – "So Get Up" – (lyrics and vocals by: Ithaka Darin Pappas) Vecto Records [Columbia]
Pirro – "So Get Up" – (lyrics and vocals by: Ithaka Darin Pappas) Run Records [Argentina]
Rab-Beat – "So Get Up" – (lyrics and vocals by: Ithaka Darin Pappas) Sector Beatz Records [Switzerland]
U.S.L. – "So Get Up" – Original & King Size Mix – (lyrics and vocals by: Ithaka) album: Totally Kaos Mix Kaos [Portugal]
Underground Sound Of Lisbon – "So Get Up" – Danny's Get Upella – (lyrics/vocals by: Ithaka) Total Kaos – Kaos [Portugal]
Joseph LP – "So Get Up" – (lyrics and vocals by: Ithaka) album: The Sound Of Brothers / People Tech Records [Spain]
Public Domain – "So Get Up" – (lyrics and vocals by: Ithaka) Derailed Traxx/Be Yourself Music [Netherlands]

2018
Dual Shock - "Get Up" - (lyrics and vocals by: Ithaka) Midijum Records [Germany]
Sebastien Pedro - "Hurt" (lyrics and vocals by: Ithaka) Berlin After Dark Records
Nathan D "The End Of The Earth Is Upon Us" (lyrics and vocals by: Ithaka)
Orion (Br) & DropGrade - "So Get Up" (lyrics and vocals by: Ithaka) Purple Haze Records.
DJ Healer (aka Traumprinz) featuring Ithaka – "End Of The World" – (lyrics and vocals by: Ithaka) Album: Planet Lonely/Label: Planet Uterus
Dostech - "Get Up" - (lyrics and vocals by: Ithaka)
VV303 - "So Get Up (2018 Bunker Remix)" - lyrics and vocals by: Ithaka
Mitekss - "So Get Up" - (lyrics and vocals by: Ithaka)
Mitekss - "So Get Up (Marcos Salas Remix)" - lyrics and vocals by: Ithaka
Sebastien Pedro - "Hurt" - (lyrics and vocals by: Ithaka) Berlin After Dark
Crypton - "The Next Life" - (lyrics and vocals by: Ithaka) Q-Dance
Crypton - "The Next Life (Extended Mix)" - (lyrics and vocals by: Ithaka) Q-Dance
DJ Delivery - "It Will All Turn To Dust" - (lyrics and vocals by: Ithaka) Black Box
David Tech - "Next Life" - (lyrics and vocals by: Ithaka) DZB
KTK - "End Of The Earth" - (lyrics and vocals by: Ithaka) Kaleidoscope
Synctrex - "So Get Up"  (lyrics and vocals by: Ithaka)
DJ Jonibigodes - "So Get Up" (lyrics and vocals by: Ithaka)

2019
Crank der Dirigent - "Good Bye World" - (lyrics and vocals by: Ithaka) Flair Berlin Records [Germany
DJ Swat - "Good Bye World" - original mix (lyrics and vocals by: Ithaka) [Hungary
DJ Swat - "Good Bye World" - full minimal remix (lyrics and vocals by: Ithaka) [Hungary]
Joy Marquez - "Next Life" (lyrics and vocals by: Ithaka) Records [Mexico]
Sai & I - "End Of Earth"  [Columbia]
Rejectiorz - "So Get Up" [Mexico]
DJ Snat featuring Ithaka – "The End Is Nigh" (lyrics and vocals by: Ithaka) Corecube - Russia
HugoP - "So Get Up (Remake)" (lyrics and vocals by: Ithaka)
John Neiland featuring Ithaka – "The End Is Nigh" – (lyrics and vocals by: Ithaka)
Br1an featuring Ithaka "Upon Us" – (lyrics & vocals by: Ithaka) 1A Recordings
Stretch N Vern - "Get Up! Go Insane!" - The Terrace Edit (lyrics and vocals by: Ithaka) London Recordings
Stretch N Vern - "Get Up! Go Insane!" KDA Let Me Be Remix 2019 (lyrics and vocals by: Ithaka) London Recordings
Stretch N Vern - "Get Up! Go Insane!" Plump DJs Remix 2019 (lyrics and vocals by: Ithaka) London Recordings
Stretch N Vern - "Get Up! Go Insane!" K & K Remix 2019 (lyrics and vocals by: Ithaka) London Recordings
Stretch N Vern - "Get Up! Go Insane!" Fatboy Disco Dub (lyrics and vocals by: Ithaka) London Recordings
Stretch N Vern - "Get Up! Go Insane!" Fatboy's Really Lost It (lyrics and vocals by: Ithaka) London Recordings

2020
Outsiders - "1000 Miles" (lyrics and vocals by: Ithaka) Sacred Technology [Israel]
Hidden Secret - "Get Outa Here" (lyrics and vocals by: Ithaka) TSD REcords [Germany]
El Jack - "Next Life" (lyrics and vocals by: Ithaka) Muscaria Project [Mexico]
Rick Silva - "Get Up!!" (lyrics and vocals by: Ithaka) House Of Rhythm Records [Mexico]
Alvaro Miranda & Spencer - "Get Up" (lyrics and vocals by: Ithaka)
Joe Waudby - "Next Life" (lyrics and vocals by: Ithaka)
Insanatix - "Go Insane" (lyrics and vocals by: Ithaka) Gearbox Digital Records
Forgiven X Derex - "The End Of The Earth" (lyrics and vocals by: Ithaka) FL Studio 20 Records
Pomella - "So Get Up" (lyrics and vocals by: Ithaka) Ithica Records/France, Belgium
Second Nature - "So Get Up" (sunrise mix) - (lyrics and vocals by: Ithaka) Portugal
Alien Project - "Get Up" - (lyrics and vocals by: Ithaka) H2O Music
Dade (ITA) "Get Up" Original Mix - (lyrics and vocals by: Ithaka) Shaman/Pressology(Italy)
Dade (ITA) "Get Up"  Parente Remix - (lyrics and vocals by: Ithaka) Shaman/Pressology (Italy)
Dade (ITA) "Get Up"  Parenti/Gioveri Remix - (lyrics and vocals by: Ithaka) Shaman/Pressology (Italy)
Niko - "So Get Up" (lyrics and vocals by: Ithaka) Niko Music Records (Brazil)
DJ Pandemora "So Get Up" (lyrics and vocals by: Ithaka
Paolo Barbato & Lineka - "See You In The Next Life" (lyrics and vocals by: Ithaka) Graba Music Group

2021
Sovax - "Get Up" (lyrics and vocals by: ithaka) Dusty Nose
Arturo Diaz - "So Get Up" (lyrics and vocals by: ithaka) Coronita
Sgarra - "So Get Up" (lyrics and vocals by: ithaka) Woolly Woolly  
Darkinox - "Next Life" (lyrics and vocals by: ithaka) Noisj.nl Records

Articles about "So Get Up" and its derivatives
2013 Magnetic Magazine [USA] Regarding version by Cosmic Gate: written by Hannah DeuPree
2013 Daily Beat [USA] Regarding version by Cosmic Gate: written by Hugh Lurcott
2013 UP Magazine [Portugal] Regarding the origins of So Get Up's a cappella: written by Maria Ana Ventura
2013 Redbull [International] "It Happened Here" Regarding the origins of So Get Up in Portugal
2014 DJ Mag [Netherlands] Regarding versions by Cosmic Gate: written by Ruben De Ronde
2015 Earmilk [USA] Regarding Armin Van Buuren/Cosmic Gate collaboration, mentioning So Get Up: written by Steph Evans
2015 Flash DC [USA] Regarding the origins of So Get Up
2017 Rimas e Batidas [Portugal] Mentions Ithaka's "So Get Up" vocal as most sampled acapella in the world: written by Hugo Jorge
2018 Redbull [International] "Essential Portuguese Club Tracks" by Sammy Lee
2019 Red Bull Music Academy

References

External links
 So Get Up official Facebook Page
So Get Up – Genius lyrics
Ithaka Beatport

1992 poems
1993 singles
Ithaka songs
American electronic dance music songs
Armada Music singles
London Records singles